Monette Dinay (1906–1986) was a French film actress.

Partial filmography

 Black and White (1931) - Joséphine
 L'agence O-Kay (1932) - Simone
 Ce cochon de Morin (1932)
 Un beau jour de noces (1932) - Marinette Devaux
 Riri et Nono en vacances (1932)
 L'Ordonnance malgré lui (1932) - Rosine
 Bal Tabarin (1933) - Chiquette
 Le supplice de Tantale (1933)
 Maison hantée (1933)
 Les deux 'Monsieur' de Madame (1973) - Flora
 Le gros lot (1933)
 Madame Bovary (1934) - Félicité
 La garnison amoureuse (1934) - (uncredited)
 On a trouvé une femme nue (1934) - Lucette
 La jeune fille d'une nuit (1934)
 Night in May (1934) - Toni
 Un drôle de numéro (1934) - Solange Ducauchois
 Turandot, Princess of China (1935) - Mien-Li
 L'affaire Coquelet (1935) - Justine
 La petite dame du wagon-lit (1936) - Francine
 Prête-moi ta femme (1936) - Riri
 Prends la route (1936) - Denise - la dactylo
 Les dégourdis de la 11ème (1937) - Amélie - la bonne
 Vidocq (1939)
 The Mondesir Heir (1940) - Rosette
 Le mariage de Chiffon (1942) - Alice de Liron
 The House on the Dune (1952)
 We Are All Murderers (1952) - La femme de Charles
 Le dossier noir (1955) - Thérèse
 Meeting in Paris (1956) - Mme Jeanne
 La Traversée de Paris (1956) - Madame Jambier
 La Tour, prends garde ! (1958) - Mme Taupin (uncredited)
 Neither Seen Nor Recognized (1958) - Léontine (uncredited) (final film role)

References

Bibliography 
 Crisp, Colin. French Cinema—A Critical Filmography: Volume 2, 1940–1958. Indiana University Press, 2015.

External links 
 

1906 births
1986 deaths
French film actresses
20th-century French women